The Andreotti III Cabinet was the 33rd cabinet of the Italian Republic. It held office from 1976 to 1978.

It was the first government in the history of the Italian Republic to count among its members a woman, Tina Anselmi (as Minister of Labour).

The government obtained the confidence in the Senate on 6 August 1976, with 136 votes in favor, 17 against and 69 abstentions, and in the Chamber of Deputies on 9 August 1976, with 258 votes in favor, 44 against and 303 abstentions.

It was a single-color government composed only of members of Christian Democracy; it was known as the Government of non no-confidence or Government of national solidarity because it obtained the vote of confidence in parliament thanks to the abstention of the Italian Communist Party led by Enrico Berlinguer.

The Andreotti III Cabinet fell on 31 January 1978, due to the withdrawal of support from the Communist Party, which wanted to be directly involved in the government, hypothesis however rejected by the Christian Democracy.

Composition

References

Andreotti 3 Cabinet
Italian governments
1976 establishments in Italy
1978 disestablishments in Italy
Cabinets established in 1976
Cabinets disestablished in 1978